Kapfenberg Airport is a public use airport located  east of Kapfenberg, Steiermark, Austria.

See also
List of airports in Austria

References

External links 
 Airport record for Kapfenberg Airport at Landings.com

Airports in Austria
Styria